Helemted chameleon is a common name for several lizards and may refer to:

Kinyongia carpenteri, native to mountains on the border of Uganda and the Democratic Republic of the Congo
Trioceros hoehnelii, native to Kenya and Uganda